Awadhesh Singh is an Indian politician from Bihar and a 3 term Member of the Bihar Legislative Assembly. Singh won the Hajipur on the Bharatiya Janata Party ticket in the 2020 Bihar Legislative Assembly election.

References

Living people
Bihar MLAs 2020–2025
Bharatiya Janata Party politicians from Bihar
1970 births